The discography of American country music singer-songwriter Phil Vassar consists of seven studio albums (including one holiday album), three compilation albums, one live album and twenty-two singles. Before his signing with Arista Nashville in 1999, Vassar was a prominent songwriter, having co-written number one hits for Jo Dee Messina and Alan Jackson, and Top 5 singles for Tim McGraw and Collin Raye. As a singer, Vassar has reached number one on the country music charts three times.

Albums

Studio albums

Compilation albums

Live albums

Extended plays

Singles

Promotional singles

Videography

Music videos

Notes

References

Country music discographies
 
 
Discographies of American artists